Smoke Sessions Records is an independent record label based in New York City.

History
Smoke jazz club started the label in 2014. The co-founders were Frank Christopher and Paul Stache; Damon Smith was added to the organization soon afterwards.

In its first year, a vinyl sampler and nine CDs were released. The music is mostly post-bop jazz. Early releases included recordings led by Harold Mabern, Vincent Herring, Javon Jackson, and David Hazeltine. They were recorded in concert at the club and were engineered by Stache.

Practices
Releases are usually taken from recordings of concerts in the club. A late 2014 list of recording equipment included: "a matched pair of Schoeps Mk. 4 and a Neuman U87 microphones on the piano; U47 and Royer 122Vs on tenor sax; RCA 77 ribbons on alto sax; a vintage RCA 44 and a Coles 4038 on trumpets; an RCA 44 and Sennheister 409 on bass; and, for drums, a pair of Neuman KM84s and a Coles 4038 overhead, a D12 or FET47 on the bass drum, and an SM57 on the snare".

References

Jazz record labels
Record labels established in 2014